Christmas in Italy begins on December 8, with the feast of the Immaculate Conception, the day on which traditionally the Christmas tree is mounted and ends on January 6, of the following year with the Epiphany.

Popular traditions

Nativity scene 

The tradition of the nativity scene comes from Italy. What is considered the first nativity scene in history (a living nativity scene) was set up by St. Francis Of Assisi in Greccio in 1223. However, nativity scenes were already found in Naples in 1025. In Italy, regional crib traditions then spread, such as that of the Bolognese crib, the Genoese crib and the Neapolitan crib.

Yule log 
The tradition of the Yule log, once widespread, has been attested in Italy since the 11th century. A detailed description of this tradition is given in a book printed in Milan in the fourteenth century. In Val di Chiana, in Tuscany, it was customary for children, blindfolded, to hit the block with pincers, while the rest of the family sang the Ave Maria del Ceppo. That tradition was once deeply rooted in Italy is demonstrated by the fact that Christmas in Tuscany was called the "feast of the log".

Christmas tree
The tradition of the Christmas tree, of Germanic origin, was also widely adopted in Italy during the twentieth century. It seems that the first Christmas tree in Italy was erected at the Quirinal Palace at the behest of Queen Margherita, towards the end of the nineteenth century.

During Fascism this custom was frowned upon and opposed (being considered an imitation of a foreign tradition), preferring the typically Italian nativity scene. In 1991, the Gubbio Christmas Tree, 650 meters high and decorated with over 700 lights, entered the Guinness Book of Records as the tallest Christmas tree in the world.

Bagpipers 
Typically Italian tradition is instead that of the bagpipers, or men dressed as shepherds and equipped with bagpipes, who come down from the mountains, playing Christmas music. This tradition, dating back to the nineteenth century, is particularly widespread in the South of the country.

A description of the Abruzzese bagpipers is provided by Héctor Berlioz in 1832.

Bearers of gifts 
Typical bearers of gifts from the Christmas period in Italy are Santa Lucia (December 13), Baby Jesus,  (the name given to Santa Claus), and, on Epiphany, the Befana.

Santa Lucia 
Traditional bearer of gifts in some areas of Northern Italy, such as Verona, Lodi, Cremona, Pavia, Brescia, Bergamo and Piacenza is Santa Lucia on the night between December 12 and 13.

According to the Italian tradition, Saint Lucia shows up on her donkey and the children must leave a cup of tea for the saint and a plate of flour for the animal.

Befana 

A typical figure of Italian Christmas folklore is the Befana, depicted as an old witch on a broom, who appears as a bearer of gifts on January 6, the day of the Epiphany: according to tradition, this figure brings gifts (usually sweets inside of a sock) to good children and coal to bad children.

The Befana, whose name is an altered form of the word , is a figure that can be connected to others that are also found in other cultures, such as the German Frau Berchta and the Russian Babuška.

A famous nursery rhyme is dedicated to the figure of the Befana:

Gastronomy 
According to tradition, the Christmas Eve dinner must not contain meat. A traditional dish from Northern Italy is capon (gelded chicken), consumed especially in Piedmont and Friuli-Venezia Giulia. Lamb is more common in Central Italy.

Desserts

Panettone 

Panettone is a typical Italian Christmas cake, a cake with raisins and candied fruit originally from Milan, but widespread throughout the territory. The origins of this dessert probably date back to the 12th century. This Christmas cake was particularly appreciated by the writer Alessandro Manzoni and by the composer Giuseppe Verdi.

Pandoro 

Another typical Italian Christmas cake spread throughout the territory is pandoro, a sweet originally from Verona, created in 1884 by Domenico Melegatti.

Torrone 

Originally from Northern Italy, but widespread throughout the country, is torrone. According to tradition, the nougat originated from a dessert served in Cremona on 25 October 1441 on the occasion of the wedding between Francesco Sforza and Bianca Maria Visconti.

Nougat 

Nougat is eaten in Northern Italy, particularly Cologna Veneta. The origins of this dessert probably date back to the commercial relations that the Republic of Venice had with the East.

Struffoli 

From Southern Italy, especially Naples, but widespread throughout, are struffoli, a type of deep-fried dough. Known as early as the 17th century, the name may derive from the Greek , which means 'round'.

Background

20th century 
In 1938, under fascism, the so-called "Fascist Befana" was introduced during the Christmas holidays, a demonstration for charitable purposes.

21st century

Religious celebrations 
Starting from December 16 and until Christmas Eve, the Christmas novena is recited in the Catholic Church.

References

External links

Christmas in Italy
Winter events in Italy
Religious festivals in Italy